"What Are You Looking For" is the third single released from Sick Puppies' 2007 album Dressed Up as Life.

Music video 
To follow up the band's phenomenal Free Hugs Campaign YouTube success with their song All the Same, in the Summer of 2008, the band held a YouTube video contest among fans around the world to select the official video for What Are You Looking For.

Charts

Track listing

External links
 http:/ /tinyurl.com/WhatAreYouLookingFor - Sick Puppies MySpace page announcing YouTube Video Contest results.

References

Sick Puppies songs
2008 singles
Year of song missing
Song recordings produced by Rock Mafia
Virgin Records singles